Belden is a census-designated place (CDP) in Plumas County, California, United States. The population was 22 at the 2010 census, down from 26 in 2000.

History

The Belden post office opened in 1909. The name honors Robert Belden, its first postmaster.

Geography
Belden is located at  (40.006439, -121.252546).

Demographics

2010
At the 2010 census Belden had a population of 22. The racial makeup of Belden was 20 (90.9%) White, 0 (0.0%) African American, 0 (0.0%) Native American, 0 (0.0%) Asian, 0 (0.0%) Pacific Islander, 0 (0.0%) from other races, and 2 (9.1%) from two or more races. Hispanic or Latino of any race were 0 people (0.0%).

The whole population lived in households, no one lived in non-institutionalized group quarters and no one was institutionalized.

There were 13 households, 2 (15.4%) had children under the age of 18 living in them, 1 (7.7%) were opposite-sex married couples living together, 0 (0%) had a female householder with no husband present, 2 (15.4%) had a male householder with no wife present.  There were 2 (15.4%) unmarried opposite-sex partnerships, and 0 (0%) same-sex married couples or partnerships. 8 households (61.5%) were one person and 2 (15.4%) had someone living alone who was 65 or older. The average household size was 1.69.  There were 3 families (23.1% of households); the average family size was 2.33.

The age distribution was 3 people (13.6%) under the age of 18, 2 people (9.1%) aged 18 to 24, 6 people (27.3%) aged 25 to 44, 9 people (40.9%) aged 45 to 64, and 2 people (9.1%) who were 65 or older.  The median age was 46.0 years. For every 100 females, there were 266.7 males.  For every 100 females age 18 and over, there were 375.0 males.

There were 30 housing units at an average density of 41.4 per square mile, of the occupied units 6 (46.2%) were owner-occupied and 7 (53.8%) were rented. The homeowner vacancy rate was 0%; the rental vacancy rate was 50.0%.  6 people (27.3% of the population) lived in owner-occupied housing units and 16 people (72.7%) lived in rental housing units.

2000
At the 2000 census there were 26 people, 13 households, and 5 families in the CDP. The racial makeup of the CDP was 100.00% White.  0.00% of the population were Hispanic or Latino of any race.
Of the 13 households 30.8% had children under the age of 18 living with them, 30.8% were married couples living together, and 61.5% were non-families. 38.5% of households were one person and 23.1% were one person aged 65 or older.  The average household size was 2.00 and the average family size was 3.00.

The age distribution was 19.2% under the age of 18, 3.8% from 18 to 24, 50.0% from 25 to 44, 15.4% from 45 to 64, and 11.5% 65 or older.  The median age was 39 years. For every 100 females, there were 85.7 males.  For every 100 females age 18 and over, there were 110.0 males.

The median household income was $6,719 and the median family income  was $8,750. Males had a median income of $ versus $3,750 for females. The per capita income for the CDP was $3,141.  All families were living below the poverty line.

Media
The primary local news source is the Feather River Bulletin, a newspaper published every Wednesday.

Politics

Weblinks

References

Census-designated places in Plumas County, California
Census-designated places in California